Scopula tricommata is a moth of the  family Geometridae. It is found in Uganda and Zambia.

References

Moths described in 1899
tricommata
Insects of Uganda
Moths of Africa